In computer programming, a standard library is the library made available across implementations of a programming language. These libraries are conventionally described in programming language specifications; however, contents of a language's associated library may also be determined (in part or whole) by more informal practices of a language's community.

Overview
A language's standard library is often treated as part of the language by its users, although the designers may have treated it as a separate entity. Many language specifications define a core set that must be made available in all implementations, in addition to other portions which may be optionally implemented. The line between a language and its libraries therefore differs from language to language. Indeed, some languages are designed so that the meanings of certain syntactic constructs cannot even be described without referring to the core library. For example, in Java, a string literal is defined as an instance of the java.lang.String class; similarly, in Smalltalk, an anonymous function expression (a "block") constructs an instance of the library's BlockContext class. Conversely, Scheme contains multiple coherent subsets that suffice to construct the rest of the language as library macros, and so the language designers do not even bother to say which portions of the language must be implemented as language constructs, and which must be implemented as parts of a library.

Contents
Standard libraries typically include definitions for commonly used algorithms, data structures, and mechanisms for input and output. Depending on the constructs made available by the host language, a standard library may include:
Subroutines
Macro definitions
Global variables
Class definitions
Templates

Most standard libraries include definitions for at least the following commonly used facilities:
Algorithms (such as sorting algorithms)
Data structures (such as lists, trees, and hash tables)
Interaction with the host platform, including input/output and operating system calls

Philosophies
Philosophies of standard library design vary widely. For example, Bjarne Stroustrup, designer of C++, writes:

This suggests a relatively small standard library, containing only the constructs that "every programmer" might reasonably require when building a large collection of software. This is the philosophy that is used in the C and C++ standard libraries.

By contrast, Guido van Rossum, designer of Python, has embraced a much more inclusive vision of the standard library Python offers us easy-to-code, object-oriented, high-level language means. In the Python tutorial, he writes:

Van Rossum goes on to list libraries for processing XML, XML-RPC, email messages, and localization, facilities that the C++ standard library omits. This other philosophy is often found in scripting languages (as in Python or Ruby) or languages that use a virtual machine, such as Java or the .NET Framework languages. In C++, such facilities are not part of the standard library, but instead other libraries, such as Boost.

Examples of standard libraries

C standard library, for the C programming language
C++ Standard Library, for the C++ programming language
Framework Class Library (FCL), for the .NET Framework
Java Class Library (JCL), for the Java programming language, and Java Platform
Factor standard library, for the Factor programming language
Ruby standard library, for the Ruby programming language
Python standard library, for the Python programming language
Standard Libraries (CLI)

References

Programming libraries
Programming language standards